Ferrières-en-Gâtinais (literally "Ferrières in Gâtinais") is a commune in the Loiret department in north-central France.

Ferrières was the site of the Benedictine monastery Ferrières Abbey, which had an extensive library in the Middle Ages.

Geography
The municipality is located in the Gâtinais region, north of the national forest (forêt domaniale) of Montargis, 13 km north of the town of Montargis, 81 km north-east of Orléans and 98 miles south of Paris. To the north the municipality borders the department of Seine-et-Marne. The Cléry, a tributary of the Loing, flows through the village.

The municipality contains the village of Ferrières and the hamlets of Saint-Séverin, Petit-Ambreville, Le Grand-Ambreville, Collumeaux, Egrefin, Birague, La Queue-de-l'étang, Tirelande, Le Perrocher, and La Grange Tascher.

See also
 Communes of the Loiret department

References

External links

 [Commune website - did not renew]

Communes of Loiret